Axhil Darvik (born 26 June 1982) is a Swedish Liberal People's Party politician, member of the Riksdag 2002–2006.

References

Members of the Riksdag from the Liberals (Sweden)
Living people
1982 births
Members of the Riksdag 2002–2006
Place of birth missing (living people)